Smooth as the Wind is an album by American trumpeter Blue Mitchell with strings and brass recorded in late 1960 and early 1961 and released on the Riverside label.

Reception

The Allmusic review by Scott Yanow awarded the album 4 stars and stated "Trumpeter Blue Mitchell is in excellent form on this very interesting session... The arrangements (seven by Tadd Dameron and three from Benny Golson) are generally quite stimulating, inspiring the trumpeter to come up with many fresh melodic solos... By varying tempos and moods, Dameron and Golson helped create one of the better soloist-with-strings jazz dates".

Track listing
 "Smooth as the Wind" (Tadd Dameron) - 5:10 
 "But Beautiful" (Johnny Burke, Jimmy Van Heusen) - 3:35 
 "The Best Things in Life Are Free" (Brown, DeSylva, Henderson) 3:18 
 "Peace" (Horace Silver) - 3:53 
 "For Heaven's Sake" (Elise Bretton, Sherman Edwards, Donald Meyer) - 3:32 
 "The Nearness of You" (Hoagy Carmichael, Ned Washington) - 3:22 
 "A Blue Time" (Dameron) - 4:52 
 "Strollin'" (Silver) - 3:16 
 "For All We Know" (J. Fred Coots, Sam M. Lewis) - 3:21 
 "I'm a Fool to Want You" (Joel Herron, Frank Sinatra, Jack Wolf) - 3:37 
Recorded in New York City on December 27, 1960 (tracks 4-6 & 8), and March 29 & 30, 1961 (tracks 1-3, 7, 9 & 10).

Personnel
Blue Mitchell, Burt Collins, Bernie Glow, Clark Terry - trumpet  
Jimmy Cleveland (tracks 1-3, 7, 9 & 10), Urbie Green (tracks 1-3, 7, 9 & 10), Julian Priester (tracks 4-6 & 8),  Britt Woodman (tracks 4-6 & 8) - trombone
Willie Ruff - French horn
Tommy Flanagan - piano 
Tommy Williams - bass
Philly Joe Jones (tracks 1-3, 7, 9 & 10), Charlie Persip (tracks 4-6 & 8) - drums
Tadd Dameron (tracks 1-3 & 5-8), Benny Golson (tracks 4, 9, & 10) - arrangement
Unidentified strings: Harry Lookofsky - concertmaster

References

Riverside Records albums
Blue Mitchell albums
1961 albums
Albums arranged by Benny Golson
Albums produced by Orrin Keepnews